Itaewon (IPA ) is multi-cultural commercial area located in Seoul, South Korea. it is one of the most popular neighborhoods in Seoul, known for its nightlife and trendy restaurants.

Etymology
The name Itaewon was originally derived from the name of an inn located there during the Joseon Dynasty. Today it's called Itaewon alluding to its abundance of pear trees (梨泰院). According to a folktale, the name was also written using different Hanja characters that alluded to foreign babies (異胎院). When the Japanese invaded Seoul (1592–1593) during the Imjin War a group of Japanese soldiers seized a Buddhist temple in what is now Itaewon where Buddhist nuns lived. The soldiers stayed at the temple for a while and raped the Buddhist nuns. When the soldiers left they burned down the Buddhist temple. The raped Buddhist nuns now homeless settled nearby and eventually gave birth to children. People from neighboring villages named the area where the children were raised Itaewon in a portmanteau of terms meaning different, foreign and fetus. During the Imjin War this was also where surrendered Japanese soldiers (이타인/異他人) lived.

History

Itaewon was originally a transportation hub where travelers could get horses during the Goryeo Dynasty (918-1392). During the Joseon Dynasty (1392-1910), Itaewon became more of a significant area. Itaewon became 1637 a refuge for Buddhist nuns and women that had been assaulted by foreign invaders. Itaewon housed the city's largest cemetery until 1937.
The recent history of the Itaewons district of Seoul's Yongsan District is closely linked to the US military base Yongsan Garrison established in 1945. With the large number of bars and brothels, the area has been coded as a dangerous place for many Koreans. Here, security was not just a local matter but sometimes blew up into national or geopolitical crises. Since US soldiers were given pleasure leave from 1957, brothels have sprung up in Itaewon. Minors and women were kidnapped and forced into prostitution well into the 1980s, the South Korean government designated some locations as official "comfort facilities" for US soldiers. Twenty years after the Korean War (1950–53), Itaewon became a shopping district. The district became in the time gentrified, and in 2013 the US military moved its base with 17,000 soldiers to southern Seoul. Itaewon also became something of a home for the LGBT movement and was considered to be as open to foreigners as it was to Koreans. However, while representative commercial buildings had been erected in Itaewon, the area's characteristic of narrow streets had remained.

Local attractions

As Seoul's International District, Itaewon is known for serving cuisine that are not widely available in Korea, such as those from Great Britain, Germany, France, India, Italy, Southeast Asia, Portugal, Spain, Turkey, Mexico, United States of America and Canada. Essentially, it is known as the "International District" or sometimes as "Western Town," reminiscent of many Chinatowns in Western nations.

Itaewon, along with neighborhoods and attractions like Hongdae, Insadong and Seoul Tower, is one of the most popular places in Seoul for tourists. Major hotels such as the Grand Hyatt Seoul and local landmark Hamilton Hotel are here, as well as several smaller hotels and guesthouses. Dozens of shops are aimed at tourists and offer Western or traditional Korean souvenirs. High-quality leather products, retail or custom made and are sold at reasonable prices (though haggling is expected) as well.

Itaewon includes the area known as Homo Hill and is Seoul's gay village. Despite the taboo nature of homosexuality in South Korea, people can express themselves openly within the neighborhood.

Itaewon was long known as a hub for high quality counterfeit goods, but those products have largely disappeared. Some authentic goods that are only produced in Korea for the international market, as well as some authentic imports are also available. Itaewon is known for its clothes makers who produce custom-made shirts and suits.

In Itaewon there is the multinational Gyeongnidan Street. It is in the middle of Itaewon's elementary school district. There are many international restaurants along the street.

Incidents

COVID-19 outbreak
During the COVID-19 pandemic Itaewon was a source of a major disease cluster traced back from over 130 confirmed cases. South Korea's media began focusing on the neighborhood after public health authorities announced that a man who later tested positive for the coronavirus visited several establishments in the area on 2 May. Because of the outbreak in Itaweon, homosexuals have been stigmatized.

2022 crowd crush

On 29 October 2022, a crowd crush occurred during the 2022 Halloween festivities. Over 150 persons were confirmed dead and over 100 were injured. Of the confirmed dead, 26 were foreign nationals. The influx of visitors from all over the country as well as foreign nationals was potentially caused by the pandemic restrictions being lifted after two years. It is said that the hotels and events were booked well before the event showing that large crowds were expected.

In popular culture 
Korean singer-songwriter JYP (Park Jin-young) and Yoo Se-yoon's hip hop duo UV released the song "Itaewon Freedom" in April 2011. The title alludes to (and the lyrics celebrate) a common Korean perception of Itaewon's "open atmosphere", in contrast with conventional Korean culture, which is more conservative. The popularity of the song and its music video inspired a parody cover song and video from the girl group Crayon Pop in 2013. Both videos were partially filmed on location in Itaewon.

The 2020 South Korean Netflix television series Itaewon Class is set in Itaewon. The drama was praised for its diverse and inclusive cast and its realistic portrayal of subjects such as prejudice and discrimination against foreigners, ex-convicts and the LGBT people, as well as the portrayal of misbehaviors by chaebol corporations. Time Magazine included Itaewon Class on its list of "The 10 Best Korean Dramas to Watch on Netflix" and Forbes included the series on its list of "The 13 Best Korean Dramas Of 2020".

Transportation
It is served by Seoul Subway Line 6 via Itaewon, Noksapyeong and Hangangjin stations.
Itaewon Station – Seoul Subway Line 6

See also
Haebangchon
Yongsan-gu
Yongsan Garrison

Notes

External links

Official Seoul City Tourism :Itaewon 

 
Neighbourhoods of Yongsan District
Ethnic enclaves in South Korea
Red-light districts in South Korea
Shopping districts and streets in South Korea
Multiculturalism in South Korea
Tourist attractions in Seoul
Entertainment districts in South Korea
Diplomatic districts